Statistics of Qatar Stars League for the 1979–80 season.

Overview
Al-Sadd Sports Club won the championship.

References
Qatar - List of final tables (RSSSF)

Qatar
1979–80 in Qatari football